Víctor "Viti" Martínez Manrique (born 3 June 1997) is a Spanish professional footballer who plays as a central midfielder for Andorran club Inter d'Escaldes.

Early life
Born in Mataró, Barcelona, Catalonia, Viti represented UD Cirera, CE Premià, CE Mataró, FP Calella, CF Damm and CE Sabadell FC as a youth.

Club career

Sabadell
On 15 July 2016, was promoted to Sabadell's reserve side in the Tercera División. Viti made his first team debut for the Arquelinats on 20 August 2017, playing the last four minutes in a 0–0 Segunda División B home draw against Elche CF. He scored his first goal for the club on 14 October, netting the opener in a 1–1 draw at Atlético Saguntino, and finished the campaign with two goals in 22 appearances for the main squad.

Gimnàstic
On 6 July 2018, Viti joined Gimnàstic de Tarragona and was assigned to the club's farm team, CF Pobla de Mafumet, in the fourth division. He made his professional debut on 17 November 2018, starting in a 0–2 away loss against Málaga CF in the Segunda División.

Atlético Ottawa
On 7 April 2020, Martínez signed with Canadian Premier League expansion side Atlético Ottawa. He made his debut in Ottawa's inaugural match on August 15 against York9. On 7 October 2020, Martínez was sent on loan to Deportivo Alavés for the Canadian off-season, where he joined the club's B team in the Segunda División B. He returned from loan on 29 January 2021, after making eleven appearances and scoring one goal for Alavés B. On 13 January 2022, Ottawa elected not to exercise its contract option on Martínez.

Career statistics

References

External links

1997 births
Living people
Association football midfielders
Spanish footballers
Footballers from Catalonia
People from Mataró
Sportspeople from the Province of Barcelona
Spanish expatriate footballers
Expatriate soccer players in Canada
Spanish expatriate sportspeople in Canada
Expatriate footballers in Andorra
Spanish expatriate sportspeople in Andorra
CE Premià players
CE Mataró players
CF Damm players
CE Sabadell FC B players
CE Sabadell FC footballers
CF Pobla de Mafumet footballers
Gimnàstic de Tarragona footballers
Atlético Ottawa players
Inter Club d'Escaldes players
Deportivo Alavés B players
Segunda División players
Segunda División B players
Tercera División players
Canadian Premier League players
Primera Divisió players